Jan Nicol Loftie-Eaton (born 15 March 2001) is a Namibian cricketer. He made his first-class debut for Namibia in the 2017–18 Sunfoil 3-Day Cup on 8 February  2018. Prior to his first-class debut, he was named in Namibia's squad for the 2018 Under-19 Cricket World Cup. He made his List A debut for Namibia in the 2017–18 CSA Provincial One-Day Challenge on 11 February 2018.

In August 2018, he was named in Namibia's squad for the 2018 Africa T20 Cup. He made his Twenty20 debut for Namibia in the 2018 Africa T20 Cup on 14 September 2018. In October 2018, he was named in Namibia's squad in the Southern sub region group for the 2018–19 ICC World Twenty20 Africa Qualifier tournament in Botswana.

In June 2019, he was one of twenty-five cricketers to be named in Cricket Namibia's Elite Men's Squad ahead of the 2019–20 international season. In December 2019, he was one of three rookie players to be awarded a national contract with the Namibia cricket team. Later the same month, he was named in Namibia's One Day International (ODI) squad for the 2020 Oman Tri-Nation Series.

In March 2021, he was named in Namibia's Twenty20 International (T20I) squad for their series against Uganda. He made his T20I debut on 3 April 2021, for Namibia against Uganda. In September 2021, he was named in Namibia's squad for the 2021 ICC Men's T20 World Cup. In November 2021, he was named in Namibia's One Day International (ODI) squad for the 2021 Namibia Tri-Nation Series. He made his ODI debut on 27 November 2021, for Namibia against Oman.

References

External links
 

2000 births
Living people
Namibian cricketers
Namibia One Day International cricketers
Namibia Twenty20 International cricketers
Place of birth missing (living people)